Paweł Tarnowski may refer to:

 Paweł Tarnowski (footballer)
 Paweł Tarnowski (sailor)